Siobhán Coady (born November 11, 1960) is a Canadian businesswoman and politician who represents the riding of St. John's West in the Newfoundland and Labrador House of Assembly as a Liberal. Coady previously served as the Liberal Member of Parliament for the riding of St. John's South–Mount Pearl from 2008 to 2011. She served as Minister of Natural Resources in the Ball government. She is currently Minister of Finance and Deputy Premier in the Furey government.

Personal life
Coady was born in Grand Falls-Windsor and raised in St. John's. She is an alumna of Memorial University of Newfoundland having received a Bachelor of Education degree. She is also an accredited public relations professional. Coady, her husband Pat and their nephew Brook live in St. John's.

Before entering politics, Coady was president and CEO of Newfound Genomics Inc., a biotechnology company; The Clinical Trials Centre, a medical research company; and Bonaventure Fisheries Inc., a privately held fish harvesting company. She is a past chair and Governor of the Canadian Chamber of Commerce and was President of the St. John’s Board of Trade in 1993.

Coady has volunteered in a wide range of activities with community organizations including as Past Chair of the Regional Economic Development Board, the Newfoundland and Labrador Business Hall of Fame, and the Red Cross Campaign. Until her election to Parliament, Coady was a member of the board of directors for the Genesis Centre, the Children’s Wish Foundation, Genome Canada, the Public Policy Forum, the St. John’s International Airport Authority, and was the public representative on the Institute of Chartered Accountants of Newfoundland.

Federal politics
Coady ran as the Liberal Party of Canada candidate in the riding of St. John's South-Mount Pearl in the 2004 and 2006 federal elections, losing to Conservative Party incumbent Loyola Hearn.

With the retirement of Hearn, Coady ran for Parliament again in the  2008 federal election, defeating her nearest rival, New Democratic Party candidate Ryan Cleary, by a 3% margin.

After the 2008 election, Liberal Party leader, Stéphane Dion appointed Coady to the Official Opposition Shadow Cabinet as Critic for the Department of Fisheries and Oceans. In 2009, Liberal Leader, Michael Ignatieff appointed Coady as the Liberal Critic for the Treasury Board.

Coady has been on several committees including the Standing Committee on Government Operations and Estimates (OGGO) and was a member of the Standing Committee on Industry, Science, and Technology (INDU).

While Coady was considered by many to be a rising star within the Liberal caucus, and led in an opinion poll before the election, she lost her seat in the May 2, 2011, election to New Democratic Party candidate Ryan Cleary by 7,750 votes.

Following her election defeat it was reported that Coady was being lobbied by members of the Liberal Party to run for the party's presidency in January 2012, after Alfred Apps announced he would not run for re-election. In July 2011, Coady announced that she would consider being a candidate in the election to be President of the Liberal Party. Her announcement came just after former Deputy Prime Minister Sheila Copps announced that she was also considering being a candidate for president. However, Coady did not end up entering the race for the presidency.

At the Liberal Party's caucus retreat at the end of August 2011, she spoke about her desire to establish a policy think tank, similar to the Broadbent Institute and the Manning Centre for Building Democracy that had been established by New Democrats and Conservatives respectively. The think tank would look at the various ideals and principles that the Liberal Party had brought to the country and investigate their vision for the country. The institute would study, analyze and find policy suggestions to questions such as how to best ensure a quality health care system in the future, as well as how to ensure innovation, productivity and job growth.

Provincial politics

In August 2011, following resignation of Yvonne Jones as Leader of the Liberal Party of Newfoundland and Labrador, Coady's name was brought up as a possible successor. While she stated early on she would not seek the leadership she continued to be lobbied by supporters to enter the race and was considered a frontrunner for the position.

In June 2014, Coady was nominated as the provincial Liberal candidate for St. John's West in the 2015 election. On November 30, 2015, Coady won the seat, defeating New Democrat leader Earle McCurdy and Progressive Conservative incumbent Dan Crummell.

In December 2015, Coady was appointed Minister of Natural Resources in the cabinet appointed by Dwight Ball. She was re-elected in the 2019 provincial election. She was sworn is as Government House Leader on October 30, 2019. On August 19, 2020, she was appointed Deputy Premier and Minister of Finance in the Furey government.

She was re-elected in the 2021 provincial election.

Electoral history

|-

|-

|-

Awards received

 In 1994, the Atlantic Canada Chamber of Commerce awarded Coady the Harvey Webber Award in recognition of her outstanding service in strengthening the Chamber movement in Atlantic Canada.
 In 2003, Coady received the Queen’s Jubilee Medal and was recognized as an Ambassador for Hospitality Newfoundland and Labrador.
 In 2004, Coady was recognized as one of the Top 50 CEO’s in Atlantic Canada.
 In 2006, Coady was named Entrepreneur of the Year, Avalon region, by the Newfoundland and Labrador Organization of Women Entrepreneurs and her company, Newfound Genomics, was awarded the innovation award by the St. John's Board of Trade.

References

External links

1960 births
Living people
Businesspeople from St. John's, Newfoundland and Labrador
Liberal Party of Canada MPs
Women government ministers of Canada
Members of the Executive Council of Newfoundland and Labrador
Members of the House of Commons of Canada from Newfoundland and Labrador
Women members of the House of Commons of Canada
Women MHAs in Newfoundland and Labrador
People from Grand Falls-Windsor
Politicians from St. John's, Newfoundland and Labrador
Memorial University of Newfoundland alumni
Liberal Party of Newfoundland and Labrador MHAs
21st-century Canadian politicians
21st-century Canadian women politicians
Female finance ministers